Obadiah Bowne (May 19, 1822 – April 27, 1874) was an American politician and a United States representative from New York.

Biography
Born in Staten Island, New York, Bowne attended private schools, and was a student at Princeton College from 1838 to 1840.

Bowne's collateral ancestor was John Bowne, pioneer of North American religious liberty.

Career
Bowne held several local offices.

Elected as a Whig to the Thirty-second Congress Bowne served as a United States Representative for the second district of New York from March 4, 1851, to March 3, 1853. He declined to be a candidate for renomination in 1852 and was quarantine commissioner from 1857 to 1859. He was a presidential elector on the Republican ticket in 1864.

Death
Bowne died in Richmond Village, Staten Island, New York, on April 27, 1874 (age 51 years, 343 days). He is interred at St. Andrew's Cemetery, Staten Island, New York.

References

External links

The Political Graveyard
Govtrack US Congress

1822 births
1874 deaths
American people of English descent
American people of Scottish descent
1864 United States presidential electors
Whig Party members of the United States House of Representatives from New York (state)
19th-century American politicians
People from Richmondtown, Staten Island